Poculopsis is a genus of fungi in the family Helotiaceae. This is a monotypic genus, containing the single species Poculopsis ogrensis.

References

External links
Poculopsis at Index Fungorum

Helotiaceae
Monotypic Ascomycota genera